Undecanal, also known as undecyl aldehyde, is an organic compound with the chemical formula C10H21CHO. It is an eleven-carbon aldehyde. A colourless, oily liquid, undecanal is a component of perfumes.  Although it occurs naturally in citrus oils, it is produced commercially by hydroformylation of decene.

It has been registered under the EU REACH scheme at >1000 tonnes by Oxea, which confirms the status as irritant.

References 

Fatty aldehydes
Alkanals